Cecil George Chandler (5 March 1902 – 29 July 1958) was a British rower. He competed in the men's eight event at the 1924 Summer Olympics.

References

External links
 

1902 births
1958 deaths
British male rowers
Olympic rowers of Great Britain
Rowers at the 1924 Summer Olympics
Place of birth missing